Li Panpan is a Chinese paralympic cross country skier.

Career
She participated at the 2022 Winter Paralympics and won bronze medals in the 15 kilometre sitting event and the 1.5 kilometre sprint event.

References 

Living people
Place of birth missing (living people)
Year of birth missing (living people)
Cross-country skiers at the 2022 Winter Paralympics
Medalists at the 2022 Winter Paralympics
Paralympic bronze medalists for China
Paralympic medalists in cross-country skiing
21st-century Chinese women